Ceroplesis militaris is a species of flat-faced longhorn beetle in the subfamily Lamiinae of the family Cerambycidae.

Description
The body is black, with two broad stripes crossing the elytra. The host plants include Celtis species, Acacia species and Maesopsis eminii.

Distribution
This species occurs in Democratic Republic of the Congo, Ethiopia, Kenya, Malawi, Mozambique, Namibia, South Africa, Tanzania, Uganda, Zambia and Zimbabwe.

Subspecies
 Ceroplesis militaris irregularis Harold, 1878
 Ceroplesis militaris militaris Gerstäcker, 1855

References

Biolib
militaris Cerambycoidea
Zipcodezoo Species Identifier

External links
Hlasek

militaris